The Boroic languages (also simply Boro languages in a wider sense) are a group of Sino-Tibetan languages spoken in northeastern India. They are:
Boro
Dimasa
Kachari
Kokborok (Tripuri)
Tiwa

The Barman language is a recently discovered Boroic language spoken by the Barman Kacharis.

Ethnologue (21st edition) include Riang and Usoi as separate languages within the Kokborok language cluster.

Jacquesson (2017:112)  also includes Bru (also known as Riang) as a Bodo language.

Notes

References

 George van Driem (2001) Languages of the Himalayas: An Ethnolinguistic Handbook of the Greater Himalayan Region. Brill.
Joseph, U.V.; and Burling, Robbins. 2006. Comparative phonology of the Boro Garo languages. Mysore: Central Institute of Indian Languages Publication.
Wood, Daniel Cody. 2008. An Initial Reconstruction of Proto-Boro-Garo. M.A. Thesis, University of Oregon.

External links
Ethnologue page on Bodo languages
Ethnologue map of languages of Bangladesh

Sal languages
Languages of Bangladesh
Languages of India

pt:Línguas bodo